Ceratophyllus phrillinae is a species of flea in the family Ceratophyllidae. It was described by Smit in 1976.

References 

Ceratophyllidae
Insects described in 1976